Argaman is an Israeli settlement in West Bank

Agraman may also refer to:
Argaman (grape), Israeli wine grape
Argaman (surname)
The Hebrew and Canaanite name of Tyrian purple